The Melvin J. Berman Hebrew Academy, referred to locally as Berman or The Hebrew Academy, is a coed Modern Orthodox Jewish day school serving the greater Washington area. It is in Aspen Hill, Maryland, with a Rockville postal address.

The school has grades from Pre-K to 12.  It was founded in 1944. The school moved to its current location in Aspen Hill in 1999, site of the former Robert E. Peary High School. It changed its name from the Hebrew Academy of Greater Washington to its current name after its benefactor Melvin J. Berman in the process.  The student body consists of roughly 700 students, including about 190 in the Upper School. There were about 200 students in the 2014-2015 school year. The school has a dual curriculum including secular subjects and judaics, with the school day generally split in order to cover both curricula. The NETA program serves as the Hebrew language curriculum for the school. As of 2020, the high school is ranked as one of the top 50 Jewish high schools in the nation.

History 
The Hebrew Academy was founded in 1944 at 1202 Decatur Street, NW Washington, D.C by a group of Orthodox Jewish leaders and was one of the first Jewish Day Schools founded outside of the greater New York area. As the school has expanded in size, it has moved several times before arriving at its current location in Rockville.

Administration
The Berman Hebrew Academy is split into four main sections. The Pre-school is directed by Rebecca Gautieri. The Lower School, grades one to five, is run jointly by Rachel Handloff and Suzy Israel. The Middle School, from grades six to eight, is run by Dr. Shira Loewenstein, replacing Rabbi Shields. Finally, the High School recently hired a new principal, Mrs. Malka Popper, to replace the former interim-principal Rabbi Shimmy Trencher. Rabbi Dr. Yossi Kastan, beginning with the 2018-2019 school year, currently serves as Head of School, replacing Dr. Joshua Levisohn.

Subjects 

Grades 1, 2, and 3 consist of two classes: General (English) Studies and Jewish (Hebrew) Studies. Beginning with grade 4, there are four classes: English, Chumash, Hebrew and Navi. In grade five, there are five classes: English, Hebrew, Chumash, Navi and Mishnah. Middle and Upper school students take nine classes. Most students take English, History, Math, Science, Chumash, Navi, Talmud, Hebrew language, and an elective.

Extra-curricular programs 
There are many extracurricular programs and clubs available at the Berman Hebrew Academy including mock trial, Model United Nations, Hamodiya newspaper, HADAS Plays drama group, debate team, student council, Math Counts, a cappella, Girl Up, Israel action committee, medical ethics club, engineering club, rock climbing, coding club, finance club, and politics club.

Athletics 
The MJBHA fields cross-country, soccer, basketball, track and field, ultimate frisbee, baseball, and volleyball teams. The teams compete in the Potomac Valley Athletic Conference, the ISBVL for boys volleyball, and the WAFC for ultimate Frisbee.

Mission to Israel 
Starting in 2004, every four years the entire Berman Upper School is brought to Israel for a ten-day long trip. The trip is meant to both connect the students to the land of Israel, some of whom may never have been before, and encourage students to "go to Israel for the year after high school and beyond." The most recent mission occurred in 2018.

Logo
The Melvin J. Berman Hebrew Academy changed its logo and school colors from blue and yellow to blue and orange. This new logo which emphasizes a big "Berman" is meant to reflect, according to the Berman Hebrew Academy website, their "enthusiasm at being the Modern Orthodox Day School of the Nation's Capital."

Notable alumni
Ari Shaffir
Shlomo Gaisin
Yehuda Kurtzer

References

External links
Official Hebrew Academy Website

Jewish day schools in Maryland
Jews and Judaism in Rockville, Maryland
Modern Orthodox Jewish day schools in the United States
Modern Orthodox Judaism in Maryland
Educational institutions established in 1944
Orthodox Judaism in Maryland
Private K-12 schools in Montgomery County, Maryland
1944 establishments in Maryland